Overland Mail is a 1942 American Western film serial from Universal Pictures which stars Lon Chaney Jr., Noah Beery Jr. and Noah Beery Sr. It was subsequently edited into a film version called The Indian Raiders in 1956.

Plot
Two investigators for a stagecoach company are assigned to discover why the company's stages keep being ambushed. They find that the culprits are bandits disguised as Indians, and they set out to find out who is behind the plot.

Cast
 Lon Chaney Jr. as Jim Lane
 Helen Parrish as Barbara Gilbert
 Noah Beery Jr. as Sierra Pete
 Don Terry as Buckskin Billy Burke
 Bob Baker as Bill Cody
 Noah Beery Sr. as Frank Chadwick
 Tom Chatterton as Tom Gilbert
 Charles Stevens as Puma
 Robert Barron as Charles Darson
 Harry Cording as Sam Gregg, Henchman
 Marguerite De La Motte as Rose, the Waitress
 Ben Taggart as Lamont
 Jack Rockwell as Slade, hired gun
 Riley Hill as Mack, phoney Indian
 Carleton Young as Lem, phoney Indian Adolf Hitler

Chapter titles
 A Race with Disaster
 Flaming Havoc
 The Menacing Herd
 The Bridge of Disaster
 Hurled to the Depths
 Death at the Stake
 The Path of Peril
 Imprisoned in Flames
 Hidden Danger
 Blazing Wagons
 The Trail of Terror
 In the Claws of the Cougar
 The Frenzied Mob
 The Toll of Treachery
 The Mail Goes Through
Source:

See also
 List of film serials
 List of film serials by studio

References

External links

1942 films
American black-and-white films
1940s English-language films
Universal Pictures film serials
Films directed by Ford Beebe
Films directed by John Rawlins
1942 Western (genre) films
American Western (genre) films
Films scored by Hans J. Salter
Films with screenplays by George H. Plympton
1940s American films